Kaikeyi is a 1983 Indian Malayalam language film, directed by I. V. Sasi and produced by Hari Pothan. The film stars Srividya, Prathap Pothen, Poornima Jayaram and Raadhika. The film has musical score by M. S. Viswanathan.

Cast
Srividya
Prathap Pothen
Poornima Jayaram
Raadhika
Vanitha Krishnachandran

Soundtrack
The music was composed by M. S. Viswanathan and the lyrics were written by Poovachal Khader.

References

External links
 

1983 films
1980s Malayalam-language films
Films directed by I. V. Sasi
Films scored by M. S. Viswanathan
Films with screenplays by Padmarajan